Toratau - one of the four shihans, located in Ishimbaysky District, on the border with the city Sterlitamak. The remainder of the reef, the Lower Permian (Late Paleozoic) reef massif, formed over 230 million years ago in the tropical sea.

This natural monument may be destroyed by The Bashkir soda company and Russian authorities.

Physiographic characteristic 
Length - 1 km, width 850 m, height - above the Belaya River- 220 m, above the soil level - 200 m, the absolute height above the sea level - 338 m.

Has a conical shape. Slopes - 20-30 degrees, but do not form rocky ledges. The lower part is covered with screes. At the base of the northern slope of the mountain there are springs, one with sulphurous water.

At the foot of Yuraktau is located the lake Moksha.

References

External links

Mountains of Bashkortostan
Mountains under 1000 metres